Phyllonorycter brachylaenae is a moth of the family Gracillariidae. It is known from South Africa. The habitat consists of understory vegetation in secondary forests.

The length of the forewings is 3.06–3.33 mm. The forewings are elongate and the ground colour is golden ochreous with white markings. The hindwings are uniformly pale fuscous and a light fuscous fringe. Adults are on wing from early March to mid-May and from late June to late October.

The larvae feed on Brachylaena discolor and Brachylaena rotundata. They mine the leaves of their host plant. The mine has the form of a semi-circular or oval tentiform mine on the underside of the leaf.

References

Endemic moths of South Africa
Moths described in 1961
brachylaenae
Moths of Africa